Mihai Botez (31 May 1922 – 8 December 2011) was a Romanian gymnast. He competed in eight events at the 1952 Summer Olympics.

References

1922 births
2011 deaths
Romanian male artistic gymnasts
Olympic gymnasts of Romania
Gymnasts at the 1952 Summer Olympics
Sportspeople from Oradea